This is a round-up of the 2002 Sligo Senior Football Championship. Eastern Harps claimed their fifth title in this year, defeating Coolera/Strandhill after a replay, and prolonging the latter's long wait for glory. The participants were expanded from 12 to 14, and relegation playoffs were introduced for this year, with Cloonacool the first to be relegated.

Group stages

The Championship was contested by 14 teams, divided into four groups. The top two sides in each group advanced to the quarter-finals, with the remaining sides facing the Relegation playoffs to retain Senior status for 2003.

Group A

Group B

Group C

Group D

Playoff

There was one playoff required, in Group D where Grange/Cliffoney eliminated Tubbercurry from the Championship.

Quarterfinals

Semifinals

Last eight

Sligo Senior Football Championship Final

Sligo Senior Football Championship Final Replay

Relegation

References
 Sligo Champion (July–October 2002)
 Sligo Weekender (July–October 2002)

Sligo Senior Football Championship
Sligo Senior Football Championship